Yanawara (Quechua yana black, wara trousers "black trousers", Hispanicized spelling Yanahuara) or Mina Punta (also Minapunta) is a mountain in the Andes of Peru, about  high. It is located in the Puno Region, Lampa Province, on the border of the districts Palca and Paratía. Yanawara lies northwest of the lake Sayt'uqucha.

See also 
 Hatun Pastu
 Qillqa

References

Mountains of Peru
Mountains of Puno Region